HMS Thetis was an  2nd class protected cruiser of the Royal Navy, launched on 13 December 1890. Her first significant mission was service in the Bering Sea Patrol with American warships in a combined effort to suppress poaching in the Bering Sea.

Under the command of Captain W. Stokes-Rees, she later served on the Mediterranean Station until relieved in March 1901. She was paid off at Chatham in early June 1901, and was placed in the Fleet reserve. Captain Julian Charles Allix Wilkinson was appointed in command on 25 November 1902, as she was commissioned at Chatham with a complement of 273 officers and men for service on the China Station. She left Sheerness on 14 December, stopping in Gibraltar, Malta and more places before arriving in China the following year.

The latter half of her career was spent as a mine-layer.  Laden with concrete, she was deliberately sunk as a blockship in attempt to block the canal in the Zeebrugge Raid during the First World War, on 23 April 1918.

References

Publications

External links

 

Apollo-class cruisers
1890 ships
Scuttled vessels of the United Kingdom
World War I cruisers of the United Kingdom
Ships built on the River Clyde
Maritime incidents in 1918
World War I shipwrecks in the English Channel